Exotic Dancer (29 March 2000 – 2 April 2009) was a French-bred National Hunt racehorse, who was trained by Jonjo O'Neill. He had a famous rivalry with Kauto Star but never beat him.

In April 2005, Exotic Dancer finished seventh in the World Hurdle at Cheltenham and as a 50/1 outsider finished third in the Grade 1 Aintree Hurdle at Aintree. In December 2005 he had his first win in a novice chase at Cheltenham.

Exotic Dancer had a successful 2006/07 season with three victories at Cheltenham, in the Paddy Power Gold Cup, Boylesports.com Gold Cup and an 18 length victory in the Letheby and Christopher Chase. However the horse finished second in both King George VI Chase and Cheltenham Gold Cup both times behind Kauto Star. He ended the season with victory at Aintree where he won the Betfair Bowl.

In the 2007/08 season Exotic Dancer ran five times, on each occasion beaten by Kauto Star including the King George VI Chase where Exotic Dancer finished third.

Exotic Dancer began the 2008/09 season with two place finishes before completing a 20 length victory in the Lexus Chase in December 2008, the horse's first win in 20 months.

A contender to win the 2009 John Smith's Grand National, Exotic Dancer was pulled out to concentrate on other races.

Exotic Dancer's final race was the Totesport Bowl at Aintree on Thursday 2 April 2009.  He started 3 to 1 as the second favourite and finished second to Madison Du Berlais. Shortly after the race, Exotic Dancer died of a heart attack in his box stall.

Notes and references

External links
 
 

2000 racehorse births
2009 racehorse deaths
National Hunt racehorses
Racehorses bred in France
Racehorses trained in the United Kingdom
Thoroughbred family 20-d